State Road 438 (NM 438) is a  state highway in the US state of New Mexico. NM 438's western terminus is at the end of state maintenance where it continues west as Pearson Road northwest Artesia, and the eastern terminus is at NM 2 north of Artesia.

Major intersections

See also

References

438
Transportation in Eddy County, New Mexico
Transportation in Chaves County, New Mexico